All We Are Saying... is an album by American guitarist and composer Bill Frisell that was released in September 2011. It consists of songs written by John Lennon, both as a member of the Beatles and as a solo artist, arranged and performed in Frisell's definitive style.  The album also features violinist Jenny Scheinman, pedal steel and acoustic guitarist Greg Leisz, bassist Tony Scherr, and drummer Kenny Wollesen. The title comes from the first line of the chorus to Lennon's 1969 single "Give Peace a Chance".

Reception

Metacritic assigns All We Are Saying an aggregate score of 69 out of 100 based on 6 critical reviews, indicating "generally favorable reviews".

In his review for AllMusic, Thom Jurek awarded the album three stars, stating that "almost none of these 16 tunes are radical reinterpretations of Lennon's songs; most stick close to the original melodies even at their most adventurous." Jurek also writes:
Opener "Across the Universe," with its twinning of Frisell's electric guitar and Leisz's pedal steel as Scheinman's violin picks up the lyric melody and extrapolates its harmonic aspects, is indicative of the recording's M.O., offering a close examination of Lennon the composer. The interplay between the three principals is remarkable, such as on the intro to "Nowhere Man," where Scheinman's ostinato tenses up in advance of the changes, and Leisz grounds her fluidly while Frisell pulls his lower strings to wind up, allowing the track to begin then flow into more open areas without losing sight of the melody.

Track listing
"Across the Universe" (Lennon, McCartney) – 5:53
"Revolution" (Lennon, McCartney) – 3:50
"Nowhere Man" (Lennon, McCartney) – 5:14
"Imagine" (Lennon) – 4:51
"Please, Please Me" (Lennon, McCartney) – 2:06
"You've Got to Hide Your Love Away" (Lennon, McCartney) – 5:10
"Hold On" (Lennon) – 3:56
"In My Life" (Lennon, McCartney) – 4:05
"Come Together" (Lennon, McCartney) – 5:10
"Julia" (Lennon, McCartney) – 3:31
"Woman" (Lennon) – 4:21
"#9 Dream" (Lennon) – 3:42
"Love" (Lennon) – 2:18
"Beautiful Boy" (Lennon) – 3:27
"Mother" (Lennon) – 6:52
"Give Peace a Chance" (Lennon) – 3:38

Personnel
Bill Frisell – guitars
Greg Leisz – steel guitar, acoustic guitar
Jenny Scheinman – violin
Tony Scherr – bass
Kenny Wollesen – drums
Lee Townsend – producer
Adam Munoz – recording and mixing engineer
Greg Calbi – mastering engineer

References 

2011 albums
Bill Frisell albums
Savoy Records albums
John Lennon tribute albums